Sambas River, or specifically referred to  Big Sambas River (Indonesian: Sungai Sambas Besar), is a river in Sambas Regency, West Kalimantan, Indonesia. The upstream is located in Kabupaten Bengkayang, flowing through the city of Sambas, continuing to Pemangkat where it discharges into South China Sea.

Hydrology 
The river is considered deep. In mouth area, the depth reaches 30 m, whereas in upstream part it is about 10 m. The width of the river is 400 m in average, while only 150 m in upstream part. The length of river is about 233 km.

Geography 
The river flows in the western area of Borneo island with predominantly tropical rainforest climate (designated as Af in the Köppen-Geiger climate classification). The annual average temperature in the area is 23 °C. The warmest month is May, when the average temperature is around 25 °C, and the coldest is January, at 21 °C. The average annual rainfall is 3542 mm. The wettest month is December, with an average of 485 mm rainfall, and the driest is June, with 106 mm rainfall.

See also 
 List of rivers of Indonesia
 List of rivers of Kalimantan

References 

Rivers of West Kalimantan
Rivers of Indonesia